is the 12th single by Japanese singer Yōko Oginome. Written by Masao Urino and Kyōhei Tsutsumi, the single was released on June 21, 1987 by Victor Entertainment.

Background and release
"Sayonara no Kajitsutachi" became Oginome's first No. 1 single on Oricon's singles chart. It also sold over 161,000 copies. In addition, the single earned Oginome the Best Talent Award at the 13th All Japan Song Music Festival.

The music video begins with Oginome being forced into a yellow bus filled with an unruly crowd of American passengers dressed as punks. Once she steps out of the bus, she proceeds to sing while the crowd dances behind her.

Track listing

Charts
Weekly charts

Year-end charts

Cover versions
 Kishidan covered the song in the 2021 Kyōhei Tsutsumi tribute album Oneway Generation.

References

External links

1987 singles
Yōko Oginome songs
Japanese-language songs
Songs with lyrics by Masao Urino
Songs with music by Kyōhei Tsutsumi
Victor Entertainment singles
Oricon Weekly number-one singles